Murder by the Lake is a German-Austrian TV crime series that has been produced since 2014 by Rowboat Film- und Fernsehproduktion and Graf Filmproduktion in cooperation with the German television broadcaster ZDF and the Austrian television broadcaster ORF. The series is filmed and set in the adjacent towns of Bregenz, Austria, and Lindau, Germany, which are both located on the southeastern shore of Lake Constance. Fourteen episodes have been broadcast as of January, 2022.

Premise 
German homicide detective Micha Oberländer (Matthias Koeberlin) and his Austrian counterpart Hannah Zeiler (Nora Waldstätten) are partners in a (fictional) German-Austrian cooperative police agency located at the border between the towns of Bregenz and Lindau. Their job is to solve murders that take place with evidence or clues in both countries, and since international boundaries are not defined in the lake, a multinational approach is essential.  The series contrasts the different personalities of the two detectives: while Micha is personable and hot-blooded, Hannah is unemotional and has difficulty with social interactions. Despite, or because of, their different characters and methods, Micha and Hannah make a brilliant team. The longer they work together the more they enjoy each other's company. Maybe even more than they would like to admit.  Helping the team is their thorough, but plodding, colleague, Thomas Komlatschek (Hary Prinz).

Recurring subplots in the series are Oberländer's marital difficulties and Zeiler's search for her missing father.

Episodes

Reception

Critical response 
The Frankfurter Neue Presse described the first film as a promising debut of a new crime series on ZDF. Not only are the two investigators convincing, but the story about apparent ritual murder provides a scary, wonderful TV-experience as well. About the third film Murder by the Lake 3 - The Sleepwalker the German magazine Focus said, that it offers a solid and exciting entertainment because story and characters are digging deep. The director Andreas Linke and the author Timo Berndt manage perfectly to show the bubbling underneath the surface. According to rtv Hannu Salonen, the director of the fourth film, pleases in Murder by the Lake 4 - Till Death do them Part with calm storytelling and unmistakable intuition for strong pictures. In this film the main actors Matthias Koeberlin and Nora Waldstätten can convince as a well balanced team with sharp dialog as well. In the online magazine tittelbach the critic Tilmann P. Gangloff named the upcoming sixth film Murder by the Lake 6 - The Return from the director Hannu Salonen the best film of the series so far. Beside the suspenseful story the film convinces because of its Scandinavian art work and cinematography.

References

External links 
 
 
 
 
 
 
 

German crime television series
2010s German police procedural television series
2020s German police procedural television series